Barry Schultz is a professional disc golfer based in Charlotte, North Carolina.
He has played disc golf since the early 1980s, and has been a professional since 1992. He is on the Innova Champion Discs Hall of Fame Team. For a number of years, he was one of the most dominant players on tour. From 2003-2009, he held the single season earnings record of $40,896, which was finally surpassed by Nikko Locastro in 2010. He is one of six men to win more than one World Championship. He is also a three time United States Disc Golf Champion, one of only four people who have won the event more than once, the others being Ken Climo, Will Schusterick and Paul McBeth. Schultz additionally holds two Masters World Championships. He and Climo are the only two men to earn both an Open and Masters world title. Schultz was inducted into the PDGA Hall of Fame in 2013.

Professional career

Open Division

As of January, 2017, Schultz has 198 professional wins in the Open Division, including two World Championships and three US Championships. He was the second person to ever win both Championships in the same year (after Climo). Schultz has 17 National Tour (NT) wins, and was the National Tour Series Champion in 2006.

2003 season
Schultz's best season was 2003, during which he won 17 out of 29 tournaments and finished in the top three in 5 more of them. He won both the World Championships and United States Disc Golf Championship, becoming the second player to win both in the same year. In addition, he won two National Tour stops and four A-Tier tournaments. He also finished the year with his highest career player rating, 1039.

Major wins (5)

Major playoff record (1-0)

National Tour wins (17)

NT playoff record (1-1)

Summary

Annual statistics

Masters Division

Major wins

Major playoff record (1-0)

Summary

Annual statistics

Equipment
Schultz is sponsored by Innova Champion Discs. He has a number of signature discs (marked with *), and commonly carries the following discs during competition: 

Drivers
Beast (Champion)*
Boss (Champion, Pro, Star)
Firebird (Champion, Star)
Roadrunner (Champion)
SL (Pro)
Valkyrie (DX)
Wraith (Pro)

Fairway Drivers
Leopard (Champion, Pro)*
TeeBird (Metal Flake)
TL (Champion)

Midranges
Roc (DX, KC Pro)
Shark (DX)

Putters
Aviar (DX, KC Pro)

References

American disc golfers
Living people
1970 births
People from Menomonee Falls, Wisconsin
Competitors at the 2001 World Games
World Games gold medalists